The Grand Chess Tour 2022 was a series of chess tournaments, which was the seventh edition of the Grand Chess Tour. It consisted of five tournaments with a total prize pool of US$1.4 million, including two tournaments with classical time control and three tournaments with faster time controls. The winner of the tour was Alireza Firouzja.

Format 
The tour consisted of five tournaments, two classicals and three rapid & blitz, respectively. Rapid & Blitz tournaments consisted of two parts – rapid (2 points for win, 1 for draw) and blitz (1 point for win, 0.5 for draw). Combined result for both portions was counted in overall standings.

The tour points were awarded as follows:
{| class="wikitable" style="text-align:center;"
! Place !! Points
|-
| 1st || 12/13*
|-
| 2nd || 10
|-
| 3rd || 8
|-
| 4th || 7
|-
|  5th || 6
|-
|  6th || 5
|-
|  7th || 4
|-
| 8th || 3
|-
|  9th || 2
|-
| 10th || 1
|}

 If a player wins 1st place outright (without the need for a playoff), they are awarded 13 points instead of 12.
 Tour points are shared equally between tied players.

Schedule

Results

Tournaments

Superbet Chess Classic 
The first leg of the Grand Chess Tour was held in Bucharest, Romania from 3–15 May 2022.
{| class="wikitable" style="text-align:center;"
|+ Superbet Chess Classic, 3–15 May Bucharest, Romania, Category XXI (2761.4)
! !! Player !! Rating !! 1 !! 2 !! 3 !! 4 !! 5 !! 6 !! 7 !! 8 !! 9 !! 10 !! Points !!  !!  !!  !! SB !! Koya !! TPR !! Tour Points
|-
|-style="background: #ccffcc;"
| 1 || align=left |  || 2750 ||   || ½ || 0 || ½ || 1 || ½ || ½ || 1 || ½ || 1 || 5½ || 2 || || || || || 2843 || 10
|-
| 2 || align=left |  || 2766 || ½ ||  || ½ || ½ || ½ || ½ || 1 || ½ || 1 || ½ || 5½ || 1 || || || || || 2841 || 10
|-
| 3 || align=left |  || 2765 || 1 || ½ ||  || 1 || ½ || ½ || ½ || ½ || ½ || ½ || 5½ || 0 || || || || || 2841 || 10
|-
| 4 || align=left |  || 2753 || ½ || ½ || 0 ||   || ½ || 1 || ½ || 0 || 1 || ½ || 4½ || || 1½ || || || || 2762 || 6
|-
| 5 || align=left |  || 2786 || 0 || ½ || ½ || ½ ||  || ½ || ½ || ½ || 1 || ½ || 4½ || || 1 || || || || 2759 || 6
|-
| 6 || align=left |  || 2671 || ½ || ½ || ½ || 0 || ½ ||   || ½ || ½ || ½ || 1 || 4½ || || ½ || || || || 2771 || 6
|-
| 7 || align=left |   || 2773 || ½ || 0 || ½ || ½ || ½ || ½ ||  || 1 || 0 || ½ || 4 || || 1 || || || || 2720 || 3.5
|-
| 8 || align=left |  || 2804 || 0 || ½ || ½ || 1 || ½ || ½ || 0 ||  || ½ || ½ || 4 || || 0 || || || || 2717 || 3.5
|-
| 9 || align=left |  || 2770 || ½ || 0 || ½ || 0 || 0 || ½ || 1 || ½ ||  || ½ || 3½ || || ½ || 1 || || || 2680 || 1.5
|-
| 10 || align=left |  || 2776 || 0 || ½ || ½ || ½ || ½ || 0 || ½ || ½|| ½ ||  || 3½ || || ½ || 0 || || || 2679 || 1.5
|}

Superbet Rapid & Blitz Poland 
The second leg of the Grand Chess Tour was held in Warsaw, Poland from 17–24 May 2022.
{| class="wikitable" style="text-align: center;"
|+Poland Grand Chess Tour Rapid, 19–21 May 2022, Warsaw, Poland
! !! Player !! Rating !! 1 !! 2 !! 3 !! 4 !! 5 !! 6 !! 7 !! 8 !! 9 !! 10 !! Points !!  !!  !! SB
|-
|-style="background:#ccffcc;"
| 1 || align=left|  || 2675 ||  || 0 || 1 || 2 || 2 || 1 || 2 || 2 || 2 || 2 || 14 || || ||
|-
| 2 || align="left" |  || 2785 || 2 ||  || 0 || 0 || 1 || 2 || 2 || 2 || 2 || 2 || 13 || || ||
|-
| 3 || align="left" |  || 2806 || 1 || 2 ||  || 0 || 2 || 0 || 2 || 1 || 2 || 2 || 12 || || ||
|-
| 4 || align="left" |  || 2770 || 0 || 2 || 2 ||  || 1 || 1 || 1 || 2 || 1|| 1 || 11 || || ||
|-
| 5 || align="left" |  || 2751 || 0 || 1 || 0 || 1 ||  || 2 || 1 || 1 || 2 || 2 || 10 || || ||
|-
| 6 || align="left" |  || 2790 || 1 || 0 || 2 || 1 || 0 ||  || 1 || 1|| 1|| 2|| 9|| || || 
|-
| 7 || align="left" |  || 2647 || 0 || 0 || 0 || 1 || 1 || 1 ||  || 1 || 2 || 1 || 7 || || ||
|-
| 8 || align="left" |  || 2573 || 0 || 0 || 1 || 0 || 1 || 1 || 1 ||  || 1 || 2 || 7 || || || 
|-
| 9 || align="left" |  || 2677 || 0 || 0 || 0 || 1 || 0 || 1 || 0 || 1||  || 2 || 5 || || || 
|-
| 10 || align="left" |  || 2457 || 0 || 0 || 0 || 1 || 0 || 0 || 1 || 0 || 0 ||  || 2 || || ||
|}

{| class="wikitable" style="text-align: center;"
|+Poland Grand Chess Tour Blitz, 22–23 May 2022, Warsaw, Poland
! !! Player !! Rating !! 1 !! 2 !! 3 !! 4 !! 5 !! 6 !! 7 !! 8 !! 9 !! 10 !! Points !!  !!  !! SB
|-style="background:#ccffcc;"
| 1 || align=left| || 2744 ||  || ½ ½|| ½ 1|| 1 ½|| 1 1|| 1 1|| 1 1|| 1 0|| 1 1|| 1 0|| 14|| || ||
|-
| 2 || align="left" |  || 2773 || ½ ½||  || ½ ½|| ½ 1|| ½ 1|| 1 ½|| 1 1|| 1 ½|| 1 ½|| 1 1|| 13½|| || ||
|-
| 3 || align="left" |  || 2760 || ½ 0|| ½ ½||  || 0 1|| 0 1|| 1 0|| ½ 1|| 1 1|| 1 1|| 1 1|| 12|| || ||
|-
| 4 || align="left" |  || 2758 || 0 ½|| ½ 0|| 1 0||  || 1 ½|| ½ 0|| ½ 1|| ½ 1|| 0 ½|| 1 1|| 9½|| 1½|| ||
|-
| 5 || align="left" | || 2814 || 0 0|| ½ 0|| 1 0|| 0 ½||  || 1 1|| 1 1|| 0 ½|| ½ 1|| 1 ½|| 9½|| ½|| ||
|-
| 6 || align="left" |  || 2650 || 0 0|| 0 ½|| 0 1|| ½ 1|| 0 0||  || 0 1|| ½ 1|| 0 1|| 0 1|| 7½|| || || 
|-
| 7 || align="left" |  || 2646 || 0 0|| 0 0|| ½ 0|| ½ 0|| 0 0|| 1 0||  || 0 1|| 1 1|| ½ 1|| 6½|| 3|| ||
|-
| 8 || align="left" | || 2610 || 0 1|| 0 ½|| 0 0|| ½ 0|| 1 ½|| ½ 0|| 1 0||  || ½ 0|| ½ ½|| 6½|| 1½|| 3|| 
|-
| 9 || align="left" | || 2367 || 0 0|| 0 ½|| 0 0|| 1 ½|| ½ 0|| 1 0|| 0 0|| ½ 1||  || ½ 1|| 6½|| 1½|| 4|| 
|-
| 10 || align="left" | || 2624 || 0 1|| 0 0|| 0 0|| 0 0|| 0 ½|| 1 0|| ½ 0|| ½ ½|| ½ 0||  || 4½|| || ||
|}

Final standings
{| class="wikitable" style="text-align: center;"
! !! Player !! Points
|-
|-style="background:#ccffcc;"
| 1 || align="left" | || 24
|-
| T-2 || align="left" | || 23½
|-
| T-2 || align="left" | || 23½
|-
| 4 || align="left" |  || 23
|-
| 5 || align="left" | || 20½
|-
| 6 || align="left" |  || 19½
|-
| 7 || align="left" | || 13½
|-
| 8 || align="left" | || 12½
|-
| 9 || align="left" |  || 11½
|-
| 10 || align="left" | || 8½
|}

SuperUnited Rapid & Blitz Croatia 
The third leg of the Grand Chess Tour was held in Zagreb, Croatia from 18–25 July 2022.

{| class="wikitable" style="text-align: center;"
|+Croatia Grand Chess Tour Rapid, 20–22 July 2022, Zagreb, Croatia
! !! Player !! Rating !! 1 !! 2 !! 3 !! 4 !! 5 !! 6 !! 7 !! 8 !! 9 !! 10 !! Points !!  !!  !! SB
|-style="background: #ccffcc;"
| 1 || align=left|  || 2645 ||  || 0 || 2 || 0 || 1 || 2 || 2 || 2 || 1 || 2 || 12 || || ||
|-
| 2 || align="left" |  || 2847 || 2 ||  || 1 || 1 || 1 || 1 || 0 || 1 || 2 || 2 || 11 || || 3 || 94.00
|-
| 3 || align="left" |  || 2670 || 0 || 1 ||  || 1 || 1 || 1 || 2 || 1 || 2 || 2 || 11 || || 3 || 86.00
|-
| 4 || align="left" |  || 2779 || 2 || 1 || 1 ||  || 1 || 1 || 1 || 1 || 2 || 1 || 11 || || 2 || 
|-
| 5 || align="left" |  || 2764 || 1 || 1 || 1 || 1 ||  || 0 || 2 || 1 || 1 || 2 || 10 || || ||
|-
| 6 || align="left" |  || 2821 || 0 || 1 || 1 || 1 || 2 ||  || 0 || 2 || 0 || 2 || 9 || || || 
|-
| 7 || align="left" |  || 2699 || 0 || 2 || 0 || 1 || 0 || 2 ||  || 1 || 1 || 1 || 8 || || ||
|-
| 8 || align="left" |  || 2729 || 0 || 1 || 1 || 1 || 1 || 0 || 1 ||  || 1 || 1 || 7 || || || 
|-
| 9 || align="left" |  || 2645 || 1 || 0 || 0 || 0 || 1 || 2 || 1 || 1 ||  || 0 || 6 || || || 
|-
| 10 || align="left" |  || 2627 || 0 || 0 || 0 || 1 || 0 || 0 || 1 || 1 || 2 ||  || 5 || || ||
|}

{| class="wikitable" style="text-align: center;"
|+Croatia Grand Chess Tour Blitz, 23–24 July 2022, Zagreb, Croatia
! !! Player !! Rating !! 1 !! 2 !! 3 !! 4 !! 5 !! 6 !! 7 !! 8 !! 9 !! 10 !! Points !!  !!  !! SB
|-style="background: #ccffcc;"
| 1 || align=left|  || 2784 ||  || 0 1|| 0 ½|| ½ 1|| ½ ½|| 1 1|| 1 1|| 0 1|| 0 1|| 1 1|| 12 || 1|| 10|| 97.25
|-
| 2 || align="left" |  || 2740 || 1 0||  || 0 0|| ½ 0|| ½ 1|| 1 1|| 1 ½|| ½ 1|| 1 1|| 1 1|| 12 || 1|| 10|| 92.50
|-
| 3 || align="left" |  || 2828 || 1 ½|| 1 1||  || 1 0|| 0 ½|| 0 ½|| 1 ½|| 1 ½|| 1 1|| 1 0|| 11½ || || ||
|-
| 4 || align="left" |  || 2791 || ½ 0|| ½ 1|| 0 1||  || ½ 1|| 0 1|| ½ ½|| ½ 1|| 1 1|| 0 1|| 11 || || ||
|-
| 5 || align="left" |  || 2763 || ½ ½|| ½ 0|| ½ 1|| ½ 0||  || ½ 0|| ½ 1|| 1 1|| 0 ½|| 1 1|| 10 || || ||
|-
| 6 || align="left" |  || 2729 || 0 0|| 0 0|| 1 ½|| 1 0|| ½ 1||  || ½ 0|| 1 ½|| ½ 0|| 1 ½|| 8 || || || 
|-
| 7 || align="left" |  || 2667 || 0 0|| 0 ½|| 0 ½|| ½ ½|| ½ 0|| ½ 0||  || 1 0|| 1 1|| 0 0|| 7 || 3|| ||
|-
| 8 || align="left" |  || 2778 || 1 0|| ½ 0|| 0 ½|| ½ 0|| 0 0|| 0 ½|| 0 1||  || ½ ½|| 1 1|| 7 || 2|| || 
|-
| 9 || align="left" |  || 2609 || 1 0|| 0 0|| 0 0|| 0 0|| 1 ½|| ½ 1|| 0 0|| ½ ½||  || 1 1|| 7 || 1|| || 
|-
| 10 || align="left" |  || 2550 || 0 0|| 0 0|| 0 1|| 1 0|| 0 0|| 0 ½|| 1 1|| 0 0|| 0 0||  || 4½ || || ||
|}

Final standings
{| class="wikitable" style="text-align: center;"
! !! Player !! Points
|-
|-style="background:#ccffcc;"
| 1 || align="left" |  || 22½
|-
| T-2 || align="left" | || 22
|-
| T-2 || align="left" | || 22
|-
| T-4 || align="left" |  || 21
|-
| T-4 || align="left" | || 21
|-
| 6 || align="left" |  || 19
|-
| T-7 || align="left" | || 15
|-
| T-7 || align="left" |  || 15
|-
| 9 || align="left" |  || 12
|-
| 10 || align="left" | || 10½
|}

Saint Louis Rapid & Blitz 
{| class="wikitable" style="text-align: center;"
|+Saint Louis Grand Chess Tour Rapid, 26-28 August 2022, St. Louis, Missouri, United States
! !! Player !! Rating !! 1 !! 2 !! 3 !! 4 !! 5 !! 6 !! 7 !! 8 !! 9 !! 10 !! Points !!  !!  !! SB
|-style="background: #ccffcc;"
| 1 || align=left|  || 2704 ||  || 1 || 1 || 1 || 2 || 1 || 0 || 1 || 2 || 2 || 11 || ½ || 3 ||
|-
| 2 || align="left" |  || 2763 || 1 ||  || 1 || 1 || 2 || 1 || 2 || 1 || 1 || 1 || 11 || ½ || 2 ||
|-
| 3 || align="left" |  || 2616 || 1 || 1 ||  || 2 || 1 || 0 || 1 || 1 || 1 || 2 || 10 || ||  || 
|-
| 4 || align="left" |  || 2795 || 1 || 1 || 0 ||  || 2 || 1 || 1 || 1 || 1 || 1 || 9 || 1½ ||  || 
|-
| 5 || align="left" |  || 2695 || 0 || 0 || 1 || 0 ||  || 2 || 2 || 1 || 2 || 1 || 9 || 1 || ||
|-
| 6 || align="left" |  || 2725 || 1 || 1 || 2 || 1 || 0 ||  || 2 || 1 || 1 || 0 || 9 || ½ || || 
|-
| 7 || align="left" |  || 2766 || 2 || 0 || 1 || 1 || 0 || 0 ||  || 1 || 1 || 2 || 8 || || ||
|-
| 8 || align="left" |  || 2728 || 1 || 1 || 1 || 1 || 1 || 1 || 1 ||  || 1 || 0 || 8 || || || 
|-
| 9 || align="left" |  || 2705 || 0 || 1 || 1 || 1 || 0 || 1 || 1 || 1 ||  || 2 || 8 || || || 
|-
| 10 || align="left" |  || 2836 || 0 || 1 || 0 || 1 || 1 || 2 || 0 || 2 || 0 ||  || 7 || || ||
|}

{| class="wikitable" style="text-align: center;"
|+Saint Louis Grand Chess Tour Blitz, 29–30 August 2022, St. Louis, Missouri, United States
! !! Player !! Rating !! 1 !! 2 !! 3 !! 4 !! 5 !! 6 !! 7 !! 8 !! 9 !! 10 !! Points !!  !!  !! SB
|-style="background: #ccffcc;"
| 1 || align=left|  || 2795 ||  || ½ 1|| ½ 1|| ½ 1|| 1 ½|| 1 1|| ½ 1|| 1 ½|| 1 1|| 1 1||  15|| || ||
|-
| 2 || align="left" |  || 2850 || ½ 0||  || 1 1|| 1 0|| ½ 1|| ½ ½|| 1 1|| 1 1|| 1 1|| 1 1|| 14|| || || 
|-
| 3 || align="left" |  || 2847 || ½ 0|| 0 0||  || 1 ½|| ½ ½|| ½ 1|| 0 1|| ½ 1|| 1 1|| 1 1|| 11|| || ||
|-
| 4 || align="left" |  || 2850 || ½ 0|| 0 1|| 0 ½||  || 1 ½|| 1 0|| 1 ½|| 0 ½|| 1 0|| 1 ½|| 9|| 1½|| ||
|-
| 5 || align="left" |  || 2791 || 0 ½|| ½ 0|| ½ ½|| 0 ½||  || 1 ½|| 1 ½|| ½ ½|| 1 0|| ½ 1|| 9|| ½|| ||
|-
| 6 || align="left" |  || 2710 || 0 0|| ½ ½|| ½ 0|| 0 1|| 0 ½||  || 0 0|| 1 ½|| 1 1|| 1 1|| 8½|| || ||
|-
| 7 || align="left" |  || 2714 || ½ 0|| 0 0|| 1 0|| 0 ½|| 0 ½|| 1 1||  || ½ ½|| 1 0|| 1 ½|| 8|| 1|| 5||
|-
| 8 || align="left" |  || 2812 || 0 ½|| 0 0|| ½ 0|| 1 ½|| ½ ½|| 0 ½|| ½ ½||  || 1 1|| ½ ½|| 8|| 1|| 3||
|-
| 9 || align="left" |  || 2714 || 0 0|| 0 0|| 0 0|| 0 1|| 0 1|| 0 0|| 0 1|| 0 0||  || ½ ½|| 4|| || || 
|-
| 10 || align="left" |  || 2645 || 0 0|| 0 0|| 0 0|| 0 ½|| ½ 0|| 0 0|| 0 ½|| ½ ½|| ½ ½||  || 3½|| || ||
|}

Final standings
{| class="wikitable" style="text-align: center;"
! !! Player !! Points
|-
|-style="background: #ccffcc;"
| 1 || align="left" | || 26 
|-
| 2 || align="left" | || 21
|-
| T-3|| align="left" | || 19
|-
| T-3 || align="left" |  || 19
|-
| 5 || align="left" | || 18
|-
| 6 || align="left" |  || 17½
|-
| T-7 || align="left" | || 17
|-
| T-7 || align="left" |  || 17
|-
| 9 || align="left" | || 13½
|-
| 10 || align="left" | || 12
|}

Sinquefield Cup 
The final leg of the Grand Chess Tour was held in Saint Louis, Missouri, United States from 2–11 September 2022.
{| class="wikitable" style="text-align:center;"
|+ Sinquefield Cup, 2–11 September Saint Louis, Missouri, United States Category XXI (2766.6)
! !! Player !! Rating !! 1 !! 2 !! 3 !! 4 !! 5 !! 6 !! 7 !! 8 !! 9 !! 10 !! Points !!  !!  !!  !! SB !! Koya !! TPR !! Tour Points
|- style="background: #ccffcc;"
| 1 || align=left |  || 2778 ||   || 0|| 1|| ½|| ½|| ½|| 1|| ½|| 1|| –|| 5 || 1½|| || || || || 2844|| 11
|-
| 2 || align=left |  || 2792 || 1||  || ½|| ½|| ½|| ½|| 1|| ½|| ½|| 0|| 5 || ½|| || || || || 2804|| 11
|-
| 3 || align=left |  || 2771|| 0|| ½||  || 1|| ½|| 1|| ½|| ½|| ½|| –|| 4½ || || 1|| || || || 2799|| 7.5 
|-
| 4 || align=left |  || 2758 || ½|| ½|| 0 ||  || ½|| 1|| ½|| 1|| ½|| –|| 4½ || || 0|| || || || 2801|| 7.5
|-
| 5 || align=left |  || 2745 || ½|| ½|| ½|| ½||  || ½|| ½|| ½|| ½|| –|| 4 || || || || || || 2758|| 6
|-
| 6 || align=left |  || 2688 || ½|| ½|| 0|| 0|| ½||  || ½|| ½|| 1|| 1|| 3½ || || ½|| 1|| 13.50|| || 2775|| 4.5
|-
| 7 || align=left |  || 2759 || 0|| 0|| ½|| ½|| ½|| ½||  || 1|| ½|| ½|| 3½  || || ½|| 1|| 12.75|| || 2727|| 4.5
|-
| 8 || align=left |  || 2757 || ½ || ½|| ½|| 0|| ½|| ½|| 0||  || ½|| –|| 3 || || ½|| 0 || 12.50|| || 2665|| 2.5
|-
| 9 || align=left |  || 2757 || 0|| ½|| ½|| ½|| ½|| 0|| ½|| ½||  || –|| 3 || || ½|| 0 || 12.25 || || 2665|| 2.5
|-
| 10 || align=left |  || 2861 || –|| 1|| –|| –|| –|| 0|| ½|| –|| –||  ||  || || || || || || 2746|| 1
|}
 Magnus Carlsen withdrew from the tournament after Round 3. All his game results got annulled. See Carlsen–Niemann controversy.

Tour Standings 
The wildcards (in italics) are not counted in overall standings.

Notes

References  

Grand Chess Tour
Chess competitions
2022 in chess